Standard Comics was a comic book imprint of  American publisher Ned Pines, who also published pulp magazines (under a variety of company names that he also used for the comics) and paperback books (under the Popular Library name). Standard in turn was the parent company of two comic-book lines: Better and Nedor Publishing. Collectors and historians sometimes refer to them collectively as "Standard/Better/Nedor".

History 
In business from 1939 to 1956, Standard was a prolific publisher during the Golden Age of comic books. Its best-known character, initially published under the Better imprint, is the Black Terror. In June 1949, the Better and Nedor imprints were consolidated as the Standard Comics line, with a "Standard Comics" flag-like cover logo. The titles previously had no publisher logo. In 1956, Standard ended, and only two titles continued, published by Pines Comics. This last venture also incorporated several titles from the defunct St. John Publications.  Most titles went to other publishers after the company folded in 1959.

Beginning in the 1980s, Standard/Better/Nedor characters have been revived by other publishers. Publisher  Bill Black used many of them in his 1980s imprint Americomics (later shortened to AC Comics). Many of the female heroes are members of the AC Comics superhero team Femforce. In the 2000s, Standard/Better/Nedor characters have appeared in writer Alan Moore's comic book series Tom Strong and its spin-off Terra Obscura. Marvel Comics used the names American Eagle, Grim Reaper, and Wonder Man for its own, different characters.

The eight-issue comic book miniseries Project Superpowers #0–7 (Jan.–Oct. 2008), published by Dynamite Entertainment, resurrected a number of Golden Age superheroes, including those originally published by Fox Feature Syndicate, Crestwood Publications, and Standard/Better/Nedor, many of which are assumed to be in the public domain but may not be.

Titles

Superheroes

 American Crusader
 American Eagle
 Black Terror
 Captain Future (not to be confused with the pulp hero)
 Cavalier
 Doc Strange (Tom Strange)
 Fighting Yank
 Four Comrades
 Ghost (also known as Green Ghost)
 Grim Reaper
 Judy of the Jungle
 Kara the Jungle Princess
 Lance Lewis, Space Detective
 Liberator
 Lone Eagle
 Magnet
 Major Mars
 Mask (based on the Black Bat)
 Masked Rider
 Mechano
 Miss Masque
 Mystico
 The Oracle
 Phantom Detective (based on the pulp hero)
 Phantom Soldier
 Princess Pantha
 Pyroman
 Red Mask
 Rick Howard, Mystery Rider
 Scarab
 Silver Knight
 Spectro
 Supermouse
 Thesson (Nedor)
 The Woman in Red
 Wonder Man

References

External links

 Nolan, Michelle. "Exciting, Startling and Thrilling Comics", "Nolan's Niche" (column), CGC E-Newsletter vol. 2, #5, May 2003. WebCitation archive.
 Nolan, Michelle. "The 'Other' Nedors", "Nolan's Niche" (column), CGC E-Newsletter vol. 3, #10, October 20034. WebCitation archive.

Nedor Comics
Defunct comics and manga publishing companies
1936 establishments in New York City